This is a list of the Austrian Singles Chart number-one hits of 2004.

See also
2004 in music

References

Number-one hits
Austria
2004